Fun and Fancy Free is a 1947 American animated musical fantasy package film produced by Walt Disney and released on September 27, 1947 by RKO Radio Pictures. It is the ninth Disney animated feature film and the fourth of the package films that the studio produced in the 1940s to save money during World War II. The Disney package films of the late 1940s helped finance Cinderella (1950) and subsequent others such as Alice in Wonderland (1951) and Peter Pan (1953).

The film is a compilation of two stories: Bongo, narrated by Dinah Shore and is loosely based on the short story "Little Bear Bongo" by Sinclair Lewis, and Mickey and the Beanstalk, narrated by Edgar Bergen and based on the "Jack and the Beanstalk" fairy tale. Though the film is primarily animated, it also uses live-action segments to join its two stories. Mickey and the Beanstalk marked the last time that Walt Disney voiced Mickey Mouse, as he was too busy on other projects to continue voicing the character. Disney replaced himself with sound-effects artist Jimmy MacDonald.

Plot
Jiminy Cricket first appears inside a large plant in a large house, exploring and singing "I'm a Happy-go-Lucky Fellow", until he happens to stumble upon a doll, a teddy bear, and a record player with some records, one of which is Bongo, a musical romance story narrated by actress Dinah Shore. Jiminy decides to set up the record player to play the story of Bongo.

The story follows the adventures of a circus bear named Bongo who longs for freedom in the wild. Bongo is raised in captivity and is praised for his performances, but is poorly treated once he is off stage. As such, while traveling on a circus train, his natural instincts (the call of the wild) urge him to break free. As soon as he escapes and enters a forest, a day passes before his idealistic assessment of his new living situation has been emotionally shattered, and he experiences some hard conditions.

The next morning, however, he meets a female bear named Lulubelle. The two bears immediately fall in love, until Bongo soon faces a romantic rival in the bush.  An enormously-shaped rogue bear named Lumpjaw.  Bongo fails to interpret Lulubelle slapping him as a sign of affection, and when she accidentally slaps Lumpjaw, he claims her for himself, forcing all other bears into a celebration for the happy new couple. Bongo comes to understand the meaning of slapping one another among wild bears and returns to challenge Lumpjaw. He manages to outwit Lumpjaw for much of their fight until the two fall into a treacherous river and go over the waterfall. While Lumpjaw is presumably swept away and never to be seen again, Bongo's hat saves him from falling down, and he finally claims Lulubelle as his mate. 

(In parody of "Jack and the Beanstalk")  Meanwhile, a jovial countryside land called Happy Valley, kept alive at all times by a singing golden Harp, is suddenly plagued by a severe drought and falls into turmoil and depression after the instrument is stolen from the castle by a mysterious and giant villain. After weeks pass, there are only peasants remaining, the story then looks into three of the peasants: Mickey, Donald, and Goofy. The trio have but just one loaf of bread and a single solitary bean to eat. During this time, Mickey has no choice but to cut the bread into paper-thin slices for the three friends to eat. Driven insane by his hunger, Donald goes into an evil rage, complaining that he cannot stand it anymore. He makes a sandwich out of plates and silverware, but Mickey and Goofy stop him and manage to calm him down. He then sees an axe and attempts to kill a female cow for beef with said axe, but Mickey and Goofy manage to stop him again. Mickey then decides to sell the pregnant cow for money to buy food.

Goofy and Donald are excited about eating again and begin to sing about delicious dishes until Mickey comes back and reveals that he sold the cow in exchange for a container of beans that are said to be magical. Thinking that Mickey had been tricked,  Donald  throws the beans down the floor, and they fall through a hole. However, it turns out that the beans are truly magical after all as later that night. 

The next morning, Mickey, Donald, and Goofy soon find themselves at the top of a gigantic beanstalk and in a magical kingdom of enormous scope, where they appear to be tiny creatures compared to their surroundings. They eventually make their way to a huge castle, where they help themselves to a sumptuous feast. There, they stumble across the harp locked inside a small box, and she explains that she was kidnapped by a  wicked giant. Immediately after, a giant named Willie emerges from the shadows, grunting angrily while simultaneously breaking into a happy song and bouncing a ball about while demonstrating his powers of flight, invisibility, and shapeshifting.

As Willie prepares to eat lunch, he catches Mickey hiding in his delicious sandwich after Mickey sneezes when Willie pours some chilli pepper onto the sandwich. Mickey tries to escape,  but Willie catches him. Mickey then plays palm reader and gains the childish giant's trust. Willie offers to show off his powers, and Mickey, spotting a nearby fly-swatter, requests that he change himself into a fly. However, Willie suggests turning into a pink bunny instead, and as he does,  he sees Mickey, Donald, and Goofy with the fly-swatter. Angry, Willie captures Mickey, Donald, and Goofy and locks them in the harp's chest so as to keep them from pulling any more escape  tricks.

In order to escape, Mickey must find the key and rescue his friends. He does so with the help of the musical harp, who begins singing Willie to sleep. Mickey almost alerts Willie to his presence by sneezing after falling into a box of snuff powder in Willie's pocket, but the same powder makes Willie sneeze and he loses sight of Mickey. Mickey frees his friends and they make a break for it with the harp. However, Willie wakes up from his sleep and spots them, giving chase all the way to the beanstalk. Mickey stalls him long enough for Donald and Goofy to reach the bottom  as they begin to saw down the beanstalk. Mickey arrives just in time to finish the job of sawing down the beanstalk, and the gigantic  villain, who was climbing down, falls to his offscreen death.

Back at Edgar Bergen's home, he finishes his story, saying that with the return of the harp, Happy Valley returned to prosperity. He then cheers up Mortimer Snerd who was crying about Willie's death, saying that Willie was a good giant who did not deserve to be dead. Just as Edgar says that Willie is a fictional character and not real, the giant appears, having survived the fall, tearing the roof off his own house in frustation. Willie inquires about Mickey's whereabouts, but Edgar faints in shock while Mortimer tells Willie goodnight. The movie then ends  with Jiminy leaving the house at night and Willie noticing the Brown Derby restaurant and putting it on like a hat before stomping off to find Mickey, with the Hollywood lights blinking in the background.

Family Cast
 Edgar Bergen – himself, Charlie McCarthy, and Mortimer Snerd
 Luana Patten – herself
 Dinah Shore – singer, the narrator (Bongo)
 Cliff Edwards – Jiminy Cricket
 Walt Disney and Jimmy Macdonald – Mickey Mouse
 Clarence Nash – Donald Duck
 Pinto Colvig – Goofy
 Billy Gilbert – Willie the Giant
 Anita Gordon – The Golden Harp
 The King's Men – The bears, and Happy Valley crows

Production of the film
During the 1940s, Mickey and the Beanstalk and Bongo were originally going to be developed as two separate feature films.

In the late 1930s, Mickey's popularity fell behind Donald Duck, Goofy, Pluto, Max Fleischer's Popeye and Warner Bros.' Porky Pig. To boost his popularity, Disney and his artists created cartoons such as "Brave Little Tailor" and "The Sorcerer's Apprentice", the latter of which was later included in Fantasia (1940). In early 1940, during production on Fantasia, animators Bill Cottrell and T. Hee pitched the idea of a feature film based on Jack and the Beanstalk starring Mickey Mouse as Jack and with Donald Duck and Goofy as supporting characters. When they pitched it to Disney, he "burst out laughing with tears rolling down his cheeks with joy", as Cottrell and Hee later recalled. Disney enjoyed the pitch so much he invited other employees to listen to it. However, he said that, as much as he enjoyed the pitch of the film, the film itself would never go into production, because, as Disney claimed, they "murdered [his] characters". However, Cottrell and Hee were able to talk Disney into giving it the green-light and story development as The Legend of Happy Valley, which began production on May 2, 1940.

The original treatment was more-or-less the same as what became the final film. However, there were a few deleted scenes. For example, there was a scene in which Mickey took the cow to market where he meets Honest John and Gideon from Pinocchio who con him into trading his cow for the "magic beans". Another version had a scene where Mickey gave the cow to the Queen (played by Minnie Mouse) as a gift, and in return she gave him the magic beans. However, both scenes were cut when the story was trimmed for Fun and Fancy Free and the film does not explain how Mickey got the beans.

Shortly after the rough animation on Dumbo was complete in May 1941, The Legend of Happy Valley went into production, using many of the same animation crew, although RKO doubted it would be a success. Since it was a simple, low-budget film, in six months, fifty minutes had been animated on Happy Valley. Then on October 27, 1941, due to the Disney animators' strike and World War II which had cut off Disney's foreign release market caused serious debts so Disney put The Legend of Happy Valley on hold.

Meanwhile, production was starting on Bongo, a film based on the short story written by Sinclair Lewis for Cosmopolitan magazine in 1930. It was suggested that Bongo could be a sequel to Dumbo and some of the cast from the 1941 film would appear as supporting characters; however, the idea never fully materialized. In earlier drafts, Bongo had a chimpanzee as a friend and partner in his circus act. She was first called "Beverly" then "Chimpy", but the character was ultimately dropped when condensing the story. Bongo and Chimpy also encountered two mischievous bear cubs who were dropped. Originally, the designs for the characters were more realistic, but when paired for Fun and Fancy Free the designs were simplified and drawn more cartoony. The script was nearly completed by December 8, 1941, the day after the attack on Pearl Harbor.

On that same day, the United States military took control of the studio and commissioned Walt Disney Productions to produce instructional and war propaganda films in which pre-production work on Bongo and early versions of Alice in Wonderland and Peter Pan were shelved. During and after the war, Disney stopped producing single narrative feature films due to costs and decided to make package films consisting of animated shorts to make feature films. He did this during the war on Saludos Amigos and The Three Caballeros and continued after the war until he had enough money to make a single narrative feature again.

Disney felt that since the animation of Bongo and The Legend of Happy Valley (which had been renamed Mickey and the Beanstalk) was not sophisticated enough to be a Disney animated feature film, the artists decided to include the story in a package film. Throughout the 1940s, Disney had suggested to pair Mickey and the Beanstalk with The Wind in the Willows (which was in production around this time) into a package film tentatively titled Two Fabulous Characters. Ultimately, Mickey and the Beanstalk was cut from Two Fabulous Characters and paired with Bongo instead. By late 1947, Wind in the Willlows was paired with The Legend of Sleepy Hollow and re-titled The Adventures of Ichabod and Mr Toad.

Disney had provided the voice for Mickey Mouse since his debut in 1928, and Fun and Fancy Free was the last time he would voice the role regularly, as he no longer had the time or energy to do so. Disney recorded most of Mickey's dialogue in the spring and summer of 1941. Sound effects artist Jimmy MacDonald would become the character's new voice actor, starting in 1948. Disney, however, did reprise the role for the introduction to the original 1955–59 run of The Mickey Mouse Club.

Celebrities Edgar Bergen and Dinah Shore introduced the segments in order to appeal to a mass audience. Jiminy Cricket from Pinocchio sings "I'm a Happy-Go-Lucky Fellow", a song written for and cut from Pinocchio before its release.

Reception

Critical reception
Bosley Crowther of The New York Times favorably stated that "Within the familiar framework of the Walt Disney story-cartoon, that magical gentleman and his associates have knocked out a gay and colorful show—nothing brave and inspired but just plain happy...And while the emphasis is more on the first part than on the second part of that compound, it's okay." John McCarten of The New Yorker wrote critically of the film, stating that "Walt Disney, who seems to have been aiming for mediocrity in his recent productions, has not even hit his mark" with this film. Time was similarly critical of the film, stating that "In spite of the Disney technical skill, it has never been a very good idea to mix cartoons and live actors. With genial showmanship, Mr. Bergen & Co. barely manage to save their part of the show. Most of the Bongo section is just middle-grade Disney, not notably inspired. And once Mickey & friends get involved with Willie, the whole picture peters out and becomes as oddly off-balance and inconsequential as its title." Variety called it a "dull and tiresome film", remarking that "all the technical work and all the names in the world can't compensate for [a] lack of imagination."

Barbara Shulgasser-Parker of Common Sense Media gave the film three out of five stars, praising the hand-drawn, frame-by-frame animation of the film, and citing it as an example of "the Disney accomplishment and finesse." She recommended the film to children who can handle peril and cartoon violence. TV Guide gave the film three out of five stars, claiming that the Bongo portion of the film is "maudlin and overlong", but that the Mickey and the Beanstalk portion is "highly amusing", praising character actor Billy Gilbert's characterization of Willie, the animation in the film, the live-action footage with Edgar Bergen and his dummies, and Cliff "Ukulele Ike" Edwards's performance as the voice of Jiminy. They noted that the film "is a relatively minor work in the Disney oeuvre", but "still quite entertaining".

Dustin Putman reviewed the film with 2½ stars out of 4, stating that "'Bongo' is frequently delightful, but with one caveat: it is glaringly antiquated in its views of romance and gender roles. The parting message—that a couple should say they love each other with a slap—is bizarrely funny for all the wrong reasons." Its consensus states that "Though it doesn't quite live up to its title, Fun and Fancy Free has its moments, and it's a rare opportunity to see Mickey, Donald, and Goofy together."

Box-office
By the end of its theatrical run, the film had grossed $3,165,000 in worldwide rentals with $2,040,000 being generated in the United States and Canada.

Songs featured in the film

Bongo

Mickey and the Beanstalk

Release

Home media
Fun and Fancy Free was first released on VHS in the United States by Walt Disney Home Video in 1982 for its 35th anniversary. It was re-released on VHS and LaserDisc in the United States and Canada on July 15, 1997, in a fully restored 50th anniversary limited edition as part of the Walt Disney Masterpiece Collection. The film was re-released on VHS and made its DVD debut on June 20, 2000 as part of the Walt Disney Gold Classic Collection. The film was released in a 2-Movie collection Blu-ray with The Adventures of Ichabod and Mr. Toad on August 12, 2014.

Availability of the shorts as separate features
Although the two shorts were not individual full-length features, as was the original intention, they did air as individual episodes on Walt Disney's anthology TV series in the 1950s and 1960s.

Bongo
Bongo aired as an individual episode on a 1955 episode of the Walt Disney anthology series with new introductory segments, which used Jiminy Cricket's narration and singing in lieu of Dinah Shore's. The short was released separately in 1989 in the Walt Disney Mini-Classics VHS line.

Mickey and the Beanstalk
In 2004, the theatrical version of Mickey and the Beanstalk (with Edgar Bergen's narration) was released as a bonus feature on the Walt Disney Treasures set Mickey Mouse in Living Color, Volume Two.

The short aired as an individual episode on the Walt Disney anthology series twice with new introductory segments, first in 1955, with Sterling Holloway replacing Edgar Bergen as the narrator after being introduced by Walt Disney. Holloway's narration was released as a stand-alone short in such venues as the 1980s television series Good Morning, Mickey!. This version also frequently aired alongside Dumbo during the 1980s. A brief clip of this version was one of many featured in Donald Duck's 50th Birthday.

Mickey and the Beanstalk aired as a short film on a 1963 episode of the Walt Disney anthology series with new introductory segments featuring Ludwig Von Drake (voiced by Paul Frees).  Von Drake replaces Edgar Bergen as the narrator in the 1963 version, for which he has a Bootle-Beetle companion named Herman (replacing the sassy comments of Edgar Bergen's ventriloquist dummy Charlie McCarthy). In the short film version of the feature, Ludwig Von Drake reads a book about fairy tales in which he shows four pictures and clips from a few of Disney's most well-known animated features, including the Evil Queen transforming herself into an old hag in Snow White and the Seven Dwarfs (1937) and Maleficent transforming herself into a dragon in Sleeping Beauty (1959). The Ludwig Von Drake version of Mickey and the Beanstalk was released separately in 1988 in the Walt Disney Mini-Classics line. This version was then re-released, in 1994, as part of the Disney Favorite Stories collection. The Ludwig Von Drake version of the feature is available as part of the Disney Animation Collection (Volume 1).

A third version of Mickey and the Beanstalk was featured on the Disney television show "The Mouse Factory", which aired from 1972 to 1974. This version starred Shari Lewis and Lamb Chop.

Directing animators
 Ward Kimball (Bongo segment: Bongo Meets Lumpjaw)
 Les Clark (Animation supervision: Bongo)
 John Lounsbery (Willie the Giant)
 Fred Moore (Bongo Meets Lullabelle, Mickey Mouse)
 Wolfgang Reitherman (Goofy, Mickey and Donald, Starvation sequence)
 Art Babbitt (Bongo)

See also
 1947 in film
 List of American films of 1947
 List of Walt Disney Pictures films
 List of Disney theatrical animated features
 List of animated feature films of the 1940s
 List of highest-grossing animated films
 List of films with live action and animation
 List of package films
 List of Disney animated films based on fairy tales

References

Bibliography

Further reading

External links

 
 
 
 

1940s American animated films
1940s children's animated films
1940s English-language films
1940s fantasy films
1947 animated films
1947 films
1947 musical comedy films
American children's animated comedy films
American children's animated fantasy films
American children's animated musical films
American films with live action and animation
American musical fantasy films
American romantic comedy films
Animated films about bears
Animated films about friendship
Animated romance films
Circus films
Donald Duck films
Films about giants
Films based on Jack and the Beanstalk
Films based on multiple works
Films based on short fiction
Films based on works by Sinclair Lewis
Films directed by Bill Roberts
Films directed by Hamilton Luske
Films directed by Jack Kinney
Films directed by William Morgan (director)
Films produced by Walt Disney
Films scored by Oliver Wallace
Films scored by Paul Smith (film and television composer)
Films set in a fictional country
Films set in castles
Films set in forests
Goofy (Disney) films
Mickey Mouse films
Animated anthology films
Walt Disney Animation Studios films
Walt Disney Pictures animated films